Job is the surname of:

 Brian Job (1951 - 2019), American swimmer
 Herbert K. Job (1864 - 1933), American bird photographer, writer and conservationist
 Ignjat Job (1895–1936), Croatian painter
 Joseph-Désiré Job (born 1977), Cameroonian footballer
 Nick Job (born 1949), English golfer

See also 
 Job (disambiguation)